was a town located in Waga District, Iwate Prefecture, Japan.

History
The village of Yuda created on April 1, 1889 within Nishiwaga District with the establishment of the municipality system. Nishiwaga merged with HIgashiwaga District to form Waga District on March 29, 1896. Yuda was raised to town status on August 1, 1964.

On November 1, 2005, Yuda, along with the village of Sawauchi (also from Waga District), was merged to create the town of Nishiwaga, and no longer exists as an independent municipality.

As of November 2005, the town had an estimated population of 3,710 and a population density of 12.18 persons per km². The total area was 304.56 km².

Climate

References

External links
 Official website of Nishiwaga 

Dissolved municipalities of Iwate Prefecture
Nishiwaga, Iwate